Pandit Madho Sarup Vats (12 April 1896 – 7 December 1955) was an Indian archaeologist and Sanskrit scholar who served as the Director-General of the Archaeological Survey of India (ASI) from 1950 to 1954. Pandit Vats is, especially, well known for his participation in the excavations at Mohenjodaro which he supervised from 1924.

Early life 

Vats was born in Punjab on 12 April 1896. He graduated in Sanskrit from Punjab University, Lahore and began his career in 1918 with the Patna Museum where he was tasked with preparing estampages of inscriptions. In April 1920, Vats joined the Archaeological Survey of India.

With ASI 

In March 1920, Vats joined the Archaeological Survey of India with a Sanskrit scholarship and was deputed to officiate as Assistant Superintendent of Western Circle in 1923 when Assistant Superintendent G. C. Chandra acted as the Superintendent in the absence of Rakhaldas Banerjee. Vats began his term by deciphering newly discovered inscriptions at Karle. But soon afterwards, Vats diverted his attention to Mohenjodaro as the excavations there had been left incomplete.

In 1925, Vats was promoted to Superintendent of Northern Circle and he supervised the excavations at Harappa till 1934-35. Shortly after retirements, Vats published the results of their excavations.

 

1896 births
1955 deaths
Directors General of the Archaeological Survey of India
People associated with the Indus Valley civilisation
20th-century Indian archaeologists
Indian Sanskrit scholars
Indian institute directors